The 2002 Crown Prince Cup was the 27th season of the Saudi premier knockout tournament since its establishment in 1957. The main competition started on 1 February 2002 and concluded with the final on 24 April 2002.

In the final, Al-Ahli defeated defending champions Al-Ittihad 2–1 to secure their fourth title. The final was held at the Prince Abdullah Al-Faisal Stadium in Jeddah. As winners of the tournament, Al-Ahli qualified for the 2002–03 AFC Champions League third qualifying round.

Qualifying rounds
All of the competing teams that are not members of the Premier League competed in the qualifying rounds to secure one of 4 available places in the Round of 16. First Division sides Abha and Al-Raed and Second Division sides Al-Adalah and Najran qualified.

Bracket

Source: Al-Jazirah

Round of 16
The Round of 16 fixtures were played on 1 and 2 February 2002. All times are local, AST (UTC+3).

Quarter-finals
The Quarter-finals fixtures were played on 6 and 7 February 2002. All times are local, AST (UTC+3).

Semi-finals
The Semi-finals fixtures were played on 18 and 19 February 2002. All times are local, AST (UTC+3).

Final
The 2002 Crown Prince Cup Final was played on 24 April 2002 at the Prince Abdullah Al-Faisal Stadium in Jeddah between derby rivals Al-Ahli and Al-Ittihad. This was the eighth Crown Prince Cup final to be held at the stadium. The two sides met once in the final, in 1958, which Al-Ittihad won. All times are local, AST (UTC+3).

Top goalscorers

See also
 2001–02 Saudi Premier League

References

Saudi Crown Prince Cup seasons
2002 domestic association football cups
Crown Prince Cup